Peak Nam Toong Temple (also called as Peak Nam Tong Temple) is a Chinese temple located among housing estate beside Lorong Bunga Bakawali 3 in Kota Kinabalu, Sabah, Malaysia.

History 
The temple was established in 1970 before undergoing renovation in 1982 with the temple patron deity are delivered from Anxi of Fujian Province in China.

Features 
The temple wall inside are filled with colourful drawings along with the murals of Four Heavenly Kings. Beside the main prayer building, there is a 9-storey pagoda and an octagonal shaped Tian gong shrine for the worship of Jade Emperor in the temple compound.

The temple also managing a kindergarten located far from the temple area.

References

External links 
 

Chinese-Malaysian culture
Buddhist temples in Malaysia
Taoist temples in Malaysia
Religious buildings and structures completed in 1982
Buildings and structures in Kota Kinabalu
Tourist attractions in Sabah
Religious organizations established in 1970
20th-century Buddhist temples
20th-century architecture in Malaysia